, real name Ken Shinooka (篠岡 建), formerly Ken Tanaka (田中 建), born 7 November 1967, is a Japanese comedian, radio personality, computer game reviewer, and commentator. He was born in Kita, Tokyo. He is married to former idol Mika Shinooka.

Media appearances

Radio shows
 1988-1990: Ijuin Hikaru no All Night Nippon (Nippon Housou, Wed (2 parts), Fri (2 parts))
 1989-1990: CREATIVE COMPANY Tomita Waon Kabushikigaisha – Ijuin Hikaru Honbu (CBC Radio)
 1991-1995: Ijuin Hikaru no Oh! Deka-night (Nippon Housou)
 1995-1996:  (St.GIGA, Satellaview)
 1995–Present: Ijuin Hikaru Shinya no Baka-chikara
(1995〜2000:UP'S,2002〜:Monday JUNK) (TBS Radio)
 1996-1997:  (St.GIGA, Satellaview)
 1998-2000: Ijuin Hikaru Nichiyou Daishougun (TBS Radio)
 2000-2008: Ijuin Hikaru Nichiyoubi no Himitsu Kichi (TBS Radio)

TV shows

Variety
 24 Feb 1989: Joudan Gahou II (Fuji TV)
 1990: Ucchan Nanchan no Yaru Nara Yaraneba! (as Nanmakun’s warrior victim)(Fuji TV)
 1990: Gigu Gyagu Gerira (Nippon TV)
 1992-1993: Hyu Hyu (Nippon TV)
 1992-1993: Suteki na Kibun De! (TBS)
 1993: Kinyou Mogura Negura (Denki Groove no Panda no Nagare Sagyou) (TV Tokyo)
 1993-1996: Urutora7:00 (Nippon TV)
 1993: Challenge Dai-Ma-Ou (TBS)
 6 April 1994: Jungle TV ~ Tamori no Housoku~ (Mainichi Housou/TBS Series)
 1994-1995: Tensai Tenbi-kun (NHK Kyouiku)
 1995-1997: Game Catalogue 2 (TV Asahi)
 1996-1997: Barikin 7 Kensha no Sakusen (TBS)
 1996-1997: Otona no Asobi-jikan (NHK Sougou)
 1997-1999: Weekend Show (NHKBS2)
 1998-2002: Gamewave (TV Tokyo)
 1999-2001: Rekishi Tanken (NHK Kyouiku)
 2000-2002: Denga na! (later changed to ‘CGTV’) (TBS)
 2000: Tekkou-ki Mikaduki Joyoru (as a TV reporter) (Fuji TV)
 2000-2001: CX NUDE DV (as the presenter, same as in “The Kaigi-shitsu”) (Fuji TV)
 2002-2003: GameBREAK (TV Asahi)
 2002-2004: Zenigata Kintarou (supporter) (TV Asahi)
 2004-2005: Gekkan Ijuin (MONDO21)
 2003-2007: Tora no Mon (only the broadcasts of ‘Unchiku Ou Kettei-sen’, ‘Net Kensaku Yama-kuzushi’ and ‘All Night Tora no Mon’) (TV Asahi)
 2005-2009: Bakushou Mondai no Kensaku-chan (semi-regular panellist) (TV Asahi)
 2007: Quiz Presen Variety Q Sama!! (always appears in the ‘Pressure Study’ intelligent celebrity competition) (TV Asahi)
 2007: Ima Sugu Tsukaeru Mame-chishiki Quiz Zatsugaku Ou (semi-regular panellist) (TV Asahi)
 2007: Hitoshi Matsumoto no Suberanai Hanashi The Golden SP2 (Fuji TV)
 2007-2009: Ijuin Hikaru no Bangumi (BS11 Digital)
 2007: Kaiketsu! Fushigi Sousa-tai (Presenter) (Aomori TV)
 2008-2009: Kashikotsu!! (TV Asahi)
 2009: Ijuin Hikaru no Shin-bangumi (BS11 Digital)

Journalism, topical shows and sports
 1993: Nekketsu Dragons Sengen (Chukyo TV)
 Around 1996: TV Jan!! (Sports Corner Regular) (Nippon Terebi)
 2003: Hikaru! Sports Kenkyusho (changed to ‘Supoken’ from April 2008) (Nagoya Broadcasting Network)
 2003-2005: Ijuin Hikaru no Yakkyu no Mikata! (changed to ‘Ijuin Hikaru no Yakkyu Ban’ in 2004) (Perfect Choice)
 2004-2007: Sports Tamashii (main caster) (TV Tokyo)
 2007-2008: Super Morning (Wednesday’s main commentator) (TV Asahi)
 2007: NNN News Realtime (panellist on ‘Koko ga Wakaran!’) (Nippon TV)

Drama
 1992: Matta Na! (role of the fighter Takimoto) (Nippon TV)
 14 Feb 1996: Furuhata Ninzaburō (the role of clothing official Iwata) (Fuji TV)
 4 Feb 1997: Bayside Shakedown (the role of stalker Noguchi) 5th episode (Fuji TV)
 19 Sep 1997: Shokuinshitsu, final episode (voice role) (TBS TV)
 17 Apr 1998: Kinyou Entertainment Jo-ou Hachi (the role of Saburou Yusa)
 30 Dec 1999: Yonige-ya Honpo (Nippon TV)
 28 August 2002: Shomuni Final (the role of businessman Masaya Sakaki)

Film and television
 1994: Kudokiya Show (role of Jin Dokuyaku (毒薬仁)) (Toei Video)
 1994: Shin Funky Monkey Teechee Do-Tsukaretaru nen! (Pony Canyon)
 1995: Fatman Brothers ~Hyakkan Tantei~ (Director and Appearance, formed a rap group ‘FATMAN BROTHERS’ with Hidehiko Ishizuka (石塚英彦) and Taguchi Hiromasa (田口浩正), also in charge of the theme song) (Bandai Visual)
 1996: Sūpā no Onna (Supermarket Woman, Toho)
 1997: Marutai no Onna (Woman of the Police Protection Program, Toho)
 1997: Himitsu no Kaden (Toho)
 1997: Flanders no Inu (the role of a judge’s voice, Shochiku)
 1999: Gamera 3: Revenge of Iris (the role of a policeman around Kyoto station, Toho)
 2001: Go! (Nikkatsu)
 2003: Gozamareji (Creative Akuza)
 2007: Gegege no Kintarou (the voice of Nurikabe) (Shochiku)
 2008: Gegege no Kintarou Sennen Noroi Uta (the voice of Nurikabe, Shochiku)
 2018: It Comes (Toho)
 2021: Struggling Man (Nikkatsu, Tokyo Theatres)

DVDs
 2008: Tokuten Eizou (directed by Cream Stew’s Teppei Arita (有田哲平)) (Victor Entertainment)
 2008: Ijuin Hikaru no Bangumi no DeeVeeDee Vol.1 (Pony Canyon)
 2008: Ijuin Hikaru no Bangumi no DeeVeeDee Vol.1 (Pony Canyon)

Bibliography
 Ijuin Hikaru no Oh! Deka-oo Hyakka (Nippon Housou Publishing)
 Shiawase no Tsubo (Shueisha)
 Silver Senryuu Kitamakura (Nippon TV)
 Ijuin Hikaru to Bengoshi Ishida Takeshi no Momegoto Kaiketsu Daishougun (Shougakukan)
 The Kaigishitsu (co-written with Miurajun and Gorou Yamada (山田五郎), Mitsunobusha)
 Kyuman-Yakkyu Manga Shaberita-oshi! (Jitsugyo no Nihon Sha)
 D.T. (co-written with Miurajun, Media Factory)
 No Hanashi (Takarajimasha)
 No Hanashi ni (Takarajima)

CD
 ‘Hoshizora no Passport’, Yui Haga, Sony Music Cause Kabushikigaisha, 1990
 ‘ARAKAWA Tamashii’, Arakawa Rap Brothers, Sony Music Cause Kabushikigaisha
 ‘Zenraman no Theme’, Saburou Maruhadaka and Zenraman Brothers Band, Sony Music Cause Kabushikigaisha, 1993
 ‘FATMAN BROTHERS’, FATMAN BROTHERS (Hikaru Ijuin, Hidehiko Ishizuka(石塚英彦), Hiromasa Taguchi(田口浩正)), Pioneer LDC, 1995
 Ijuin Hikaru Senkyoku Oba Kayou (label: EMI Music Japan ASIN: B000228X0A) Omnibus 2004
 ‘Nippon Mukashi-banashi~Fairy Stories~10th Edition’, Hikaru Ijuin, Youko Kon( 今陽子), Shingo Tsurumi (鶴見辰吾), Mami Yamase (山瀬まみ), Columbia Music Entertainment, 2005; Horipro talent agency’s 45th anniversary recitation album series (Horipro star talent reading Japan’s old tales)

Serials
 Ijuin Hikaru Sekkin ni Tsuki Game Keihou Hatsureichuu ‘Shuupan Famitsu’ (Enterbrain) – Column Series
 Yuukan TU-KA (TU-KA Original Contents) 3 times weekly, but the publication ended on 29 Sep 2006.  The later published ‘No Hanashi’ and ‘No Hanashi ni’ included improved and revised versions of the contents.

References

1967 births
Japanese comedians
Japanese radio personalities
Living people
Comedians from Tokyo